The Gadflys are an Australian group, active from 1982 to 2001. They released their debut single "Don't Sleep in the Subway" / "(Do the) Apathy" in 1983. The group began as a punk and '80s synth pop group and incorporated acoustic instruments such as classical guitar, clarinet and double bass. The group spent three years on Paul McDermotts satirical TV show Good News Week and have backed artists such as Neil Finn, Steve Harley, Glen Tilbrook, Diesel and Yothu Yindi.

In 2019, the group released their first album in 19 years.

History
Prior to The Gadflys, brothers Phil and Mick Moriarty went through Canberra punk bands The Slammers and Brainiac Five before the first iteration of The Gadflys appeared. Due to job changes and age issues, there was some shuffling in the line-up. It eventually firmed up with Elmo Reid on bass and Pete Velzen on drums.

The band split in 1985, before Phil and Mick reformed it in 1989 as a three-piece with Andy Lewis on double bass. This second iteration of The Gadflys saw the shift in style from punk to what Phil Moriarty coined as "Mongrel Jazz", saying, "It was kind of because I played clarinet which, unlike saxophone, is not really a rock instrument. We were influenced by bands like The Violent Femmes and The Pogues."

Discography

Albums

Extended plays

References

1982 establishments in Australia
Musical groups established in 1982